George Moody (September 24, 1937 – March 6, 2017) was an American football coach. He served as the head football coach at Virginia State University from 1981 to 1990 and two stints as the head football coach at Elizabeth City State University, from 1993 to 1995 and from 1998 to 1999, compiling a career college football coaching record of 68–86–2.

Moody graduated from I. C. Norcom High School in Portsmouth, Virginia He played college football at Virginia State as a fullback. He was an assistant football coach at his alma mater from 1973 until he was appointed head football coach in December 1980.

Head coaching record

References

1937 births
2017 deaths
American football fullbacks
Elizabeth City State Vikings football coaches
Norfolk State Spartans football coaches
Virginia State Trojans football coaches
Virginia State Trojans football players
Sportspeople from Portsmouth, Virginia
Coaches of American football from Virginia
Players of American football from Virginia
African-American coaches of American football
African-American players of American football
20th-century African-American sportspeople
21st-century African-American people